Amlodipine/olmesartan, sold under the brand name Azor, among others is a fixed-dose combination medication used to treat high blood pressure. It contains amlodipine, as the besilate, a dihydropyridine calcium channel blocker, and olmesartan medoxomil, an angiotensin II receptor blocker.

Amlodipine/olmesartan was approved for medical use in the United States in September 2007. It is available as a generic medication.

Medical uses 
The combination is indicated for the treatment of hypertension, alone or with other antihypertensive agents, to lower blood pressure.

History 
The combination has been studied in clinical trials; one test showed it reduced blood pressure during a 24-hour period and was well tolerated.

References

External links 
 

Antihypertensive agents
Calcium channel blockers
Combination drugs